Jai Gangaajal is a 2016 Indian crime drama film directed by Prakash Jha. It is a follow-up to the 2003 crime film Gangaajal, and stars Priyanka Chopra in the lead role with Jha appearing in a supporting role.  It also features Manav Kaul, Rahul Bhat, and Queen Harish.

The film was released worldwide on 4 March 2016. The Government of Madhya Pradesh declared Jai Gangaajal tax-free on 9 March 2016.

Plot 
Babloo Pandey (Manav Kaul), the MLA of Bankipur district and his brother Dabloo Pandey (Ninad Kamat) run a jungle raaj in their town of Lakhisarai. They are grabbing land for a power plant whose financiers are backing their party politically. The home minister, Ramakant Chowdhary (Kiran Karmarkar) appoints Abha Mathur, IPS (Priyanka Chopra) as the SP expecting her to be soft towards the criminals and supportive to him, being her mentor as well as the home minister. But she goes all out against the criminal brothers. Her subordinates get encouraged by her brave acts against corruption and slowly bringing the jungle raaj to an end. Bhola Nath Singh aka B.N. Singh (Prakash Jha) is a corrupt circle Officer (DSP) who has helped the brothers for a long time by using legal loopholes and other corrupt ways to keep them out of harm's way in return for financial favours and political support.

As the brothers feel cornered, Dabloo's goons kidnaps an orphaned teenage girl Sunita (Vega Tamotia), who and her younger brother Nagesh (Ayush Mahesh Khedekar) refuse to give away the land. After the kidnapping, Dabloo rapes and kills the girl and hangs her from a tree showing this as a suicide just as her father had committed suicide too under the pressure of selling the land. Singh comes to his senses after seeing this brutal crime and tries to arrest Dabloo Pandey, which starts a riot in the town inducing Nagesh, the younger brother of the murdered girl to use his belt to throttle Dabloo's neck and killing him, seeing which the villagers gather around some more goons and the corrupt Sarpanch and kill them and hang them on the tree claiming it to be suicides. This also starts a chain reaction where corrupt people are killed in a similar manner elsewhere. Abha is frustrated and is unable to control these illegal killings. She tries her best to control the law and order. Singh is attacked by Babloo and his goons and gets injured. Babloo frantically searches for Nagesh, who has killed Dabloo and is now hidden away by Singh from Babloo. Babloo's goons locate Nagesh and take him in a gunny bag to Babloo, who wants to eliminate him by hanging. But in a final showdown, Babloo Pandey gets arrested and the reign of corruption, terror, and anarchy comes to an end.

Cast 
 Priyanka Chopra as Superintendent of Police, Abha Mathur of the Indian Police Service (IPS)
 Prakash Jha as Deputy Superintendent of Police, Bhola Nath Singh IPS
 Kiran Karmarkar as Ramakant Chowdhary, Home Minister
 Manav Kaul as MLA Babloo Pandey
 Ninad Kamat as Dabloo Pandey
 Murali Sharma as Munna Mardani
 Rahul Bhat as Pawan Raghav
 Vega Tamotia as Sunita
 Ayush Mahesh Khedekar as Nagesh, Sunita's brother
 Jagat Singh Solanki as Amreek Tiwari
 Indraneel Bhattacharya as IG Mithilesh Kumar IPS
 Pranay Narayan as Ratnakar

Production 
Jai Gangaajal was shot in Bhopal. Priyanka Chopra started shooting for the film in June 2015. The shooting took place in places like Jama Masjid Chowk bazaar in old Bhopal.

Soundtrack 

Music for this film is given by Salim–Sulaiman, while the lyrics have been penned by Manoj Muntashir. Prakash Jha has written additional lyrics for the song "Najar Tori Raja".

Critical reception 
Jai Gangaajal got mixed reviews from the critics. Bollywood Hungama gave 3 stars out of 5, mentioning the screenplay engaging, cinematography decent, editing praiseworthy, dialogues excellent. As for the performances, Priyanka Chopra delivers a superlative performance, be it her perfect and impeccable timing or her intimidating screen persona and presence but Prakash Jha pushes himself a bit too hard to get the nuances and the finer points of his character. Rajeev Masand gave the film 2.5 stars out of 5, mentioning it as a predictable police drama filled with the usual stereotypes but added that Priyanka Chopra and Prakash Jha's performances engaging. Srijana Mitra Das from The Times of India gave the film 3.5 stars. She praised the dialogues, editing and story, writing, "It weaves together crucial contemporary threads – land mafias, corrupt netas, broker-cops, broken farmers-with Jha's enduring concern about vigilante justice." She applauded Priyanka Chopra's performance, writing, "Priyanka Chopra shines as 'Madam Sir' Abha Mathur, whose lightning slaps and lathi charges have you applauding. This is a polished, restrained Priyanka, who barely smiles but conveys the ethics and empathy of the law." She commended Rahul Bhat's cameo and the dynamics between BN and Dablu but was disappointed with Manav Kaul's performance in particular. Rohit Vats of Hindustan Times gave 2.5 stars, writing, "Jai Gangaajal is just another attempt at making a blockbuster, but it lacks the depth of Gangaajal and Apharan. Still, there's enough for the audience to keep whistling and clapping." According to him, Prakash Jha is restrained in dialogue delivery and really effective in emotional scenes. He wrote that the storyline doesn't offer anything that haven't seen before but it has tear-inducing moments with explosive dialogues. Writing for NDTV, Saibal Chatterjee gave 2.5 stars, saying, "Despite the topical themes it tackles and all the supercharged action that unfolds on the screen, Jai Gangaajal never really kicks into top gear." Shubhra Gupta from The Indian Express gave only 1.5 stars, writing "Priyanka Chopra's too-sophisticated unmade-up-make-up is very distracting, even in her few convincing moments. And the film goes on for far too long, even when we know how of it all will end." However, she was all praise for Prakash Jha's full-fledged role.

Awards and nominations

References

External links 
 
 

2010s Hindi-language films
2016 crime drama films
2016 films
Indian crime drama films
Films set in Bihar
Films directed by Prakash Jha
Films scored by Salim–Sulaiman
Films shot in Madhya Pradesh
Fictional portrayals of the Bihar Police